Actaea japonica, the Japanese bugbane, is a species of flowering plant in the family Ranunculaceae. It is native to central and southern China including Hainan, Jeju Island in South Korea, and central and southern Japan. A perennial, the Royal Horticultural Society considers it to be a good plant to attract pollinators.

Cultivars

It has a number of commercially available cultivars, including 'ChejuDo' and 'Silver Dance'.

References

japonica
Garden plants of Asia
Flora of North-Central China
Flora of South-Central China
Flora of Southeast China
Flora of Hainan
Flora of South Korea
Flora of Japan
Plants described in 1784